Eurema boisduvaliana, commonly known as Boisduval's yellow, is a butterfly in the family Pieridae. It is found from Costa Rica north to Mexico. Rare strays may be found in southern Florida, but it is a regular migrant to south-eastern Arizona, south-western New Mexico, and southern Texas. The habitat consists of subtropical forests and forest edges, scrubs, roadsides and pastures.

The upperside is lemon yellow with black borders. Each hindwing is slightly pointed. There is a weak "dog's head" pattern on the male forewing. The hindwings have a wide black border projecting into a yellow ground colour. The female forewing is black at the apex and the hindwing has a narrow black edge. Adults are on wing from April to November in southern Texas and northward. They are on wing year round in the tropics. Adults feed on flower nectar.

The larvae feed on Cassia species.

Taxonomy
Eurema boisduvaliana is treated as a subspecies of Eurema arbela by most authors.

References

boisduvaliana
Butterflies of North America
Butterflies of Central America
Butterflies of the Caribbean
Butterflies described in 1865
Taxa named by Baron Cajetan von Felder
Taxa named by Rudolf Felder